The 2023 Savannah mayoral election will take place in 2023 to elect the mayor of Savannah, Georgia. The election will be officially nonpartisan. Incumbent mayor Van Johnson is running for re-election to a second term in office.

Candidates

Declared
Kesha Gibson-Carter, at-large alderwoman
Van Johnson, incumbent mayor (Party affiliation: Democratic)

References

Savannah
Mayoral elections in Savannah, Georgia
Savannah